An Chol-Hyok (Hanja: 安哲赫,, born 27 June 1987) is a North Korean football striker. He plays for Rimyongsu Sports Group.

An has made three appearances for the Korea DPR national football team in FIFA World Cup qualifying matches.

Goals for senior national team

References

1987 births
Living people
North Korean footballers
North Korea international footballers
2010 FIFA World Cup players
2011 AFC Asian Cup players
Rimyongsu Sports Club players
Association football fullbacks
Association football central defenders
Footballers at the 2006 Asian Games
Footballers at the 2010 Asian Games
Asian Games competitors for North Korea